The Himmel's Church Covered Bridge crosses over Schwaben Creek on Middle Creek Road, east of Rebuck, Pennsylvania, in Washington Township, Northumberland County, Pennsylvania. 

It was added to the National Register of Historic Places on August 8, 1979.

History
Built in 1874, this covered bridge was rehabilitated in 1973. It is a King post, truss-style, wooden, covered bridge that is forty-four feet long.

It was added to the National Register of Historic Places on August 8, 1979, and currently remains in use to automobile traffic.

In popular culture
The Bridge is located near the site of the Schwaben Creek werewolf, according to local folklore.

References

External links
Bridgehunter.com: Himmel's Church Covered Bridge

Covered bridges in Northumberland County, Pennsylvania
Covered bridges on the National Register of Historic Places in Pennsylvania
Bridges completed in 1874
Wooden bridges in Pennsylvania
Bridges in Northumberland County, Pennsylvania
Tourist attractions in Northumberland County, Pennsylvania
National Register of Historic Places in Northumberland County, Pennsylvania
Road bridges on the National Register of Historic Places in Pennsylvania
King post truss bridges in the United States